Results from Norwegian football in 1950.

Hovedserien 1949/50

Group A

Group B

Championship final
June 11: Fredrikstad - Fram 1-1

June 18: Fram - Fredrikstad 1-0 (agg. 2-1)

First Division

District I

District II; Group A

District II; Group B

District III

District IV, Group A

District IV; Group B

District V, Group A

District V, Group B

District VI

District VII

District VIII

Play-off Preliminary Round
May 29: Solberg - Geithus 0-2

May 31: Odd - Larvik Turn 3-0
Start - Stavanger 2-3

June 4: Geithus - Solberg 1-1 (agg. 3-1)
Stavanger - Start 3-1 (agg. 6-3)
June 7: Larvik Turn - Odd 2-0 (agg. 2-3)

Play-off Group A
June 11: Stavanger - Brann 2-2
Hamar - Lisleby 1-3
June 18: Lisleby - Stavanger 2-0
Brann - Hamar 6-0
July 2: Lisleby - Brann 2-3
Stavanger - Hamar 5-2

Play-off Group B
June 11: Geithus - Odd 1-2
Kristiansund - Kvik 1-0
June 18: Odd - Kristiansund 2-0
Kvik - Geithus 5-2
July 2: Odd - Kvik 2-0
.Geithus - Kristiansund 1-1

Relegation play-off
Kongsberg - Frigg 1-1

Frigg - Kongsberg 2-0 (agg. 3-1)

Kongsberg relegated.

Promoted to first division
Akademisk, Askim, Baune, Bjørkelangen, Borgen, Bækkelaget, Flint, Hødd, Nordnes, Randaberg, Raufoss, Sportsklubben 31, Steinkjer, Strong, Sørfjell, Tryggkameratene, Tønsberg Turn, Urædd, Vang and Vidar.

Norwegian Cup

Final

Northern Norwegian Cup

Final

National team

References

    
Seasons in Norwegian football